The 1988 San Diego State Aztecs football team represented San Diego State University during the 1988 NCAA Division I-A football season as a member of the Western Athletic Conference (WAC).

The team was led by head coach Denny Stolz, in his third year. They played home games at Jack Murphy Stadium in San Diego, California. They completed the season with a record of three wins, eight losses (3–8, 3–5 WAC).

Schedule

Team players in the NFL
The following were selected in the 1989 NFL Draft.

Team awards

Notes

References

San Diego State
San Diego State Aztecs football seasons
San Diego State Aztecs football